André Frossard (14 January 1915 – 2 February 1995) was a French journalist and essayist.

Early life

André Frossard was born on 14 January 1915 in Saint-Maurice-Colombier, Doubs, France. His father, Louis-Oscar Frossardan, was one of the founders of the French Communist Party and served as its first Secretary-General. Later he held a series of ministerial positions in the Government of the Popular Front. Frossard's paternal grandmother was Jewish, and his home village in Foussemagne, France was the only village in France with a synagogue but no church.  After attending the École nationale supérieure des arts décoratifs to complete his education, Frossard began a career in journalism as a cartoonist and columnist.

Conversion to Roman Catholicism

Raised as an atheist, at the age of 20 Frossard converted to Catholicism and was baptized in the chapel of the Sisters of Adoration on 8 July 1935. He explained his conversion in the title of his 1969 bestseller Dieu existe, je l'ai rencontré (God Exists, I Met Him).

French Resistance

Frossard joined the French Navy in September 1936 and entered into the French Resistance upon demobilization. He was arrested by the Gestapo in Lyon on 10 December 1943. He was interned in the "Jew Shed" of Montluc prison and was one of seven survivors of a massacre in Bron on 2 August 1944, in which 72 were killed. He was awarded the Legion of Honor and promoted to the rank of officer by General Charles de Gaulle.

After World War II

After the war, Frossard worked at L'Aurore before joining Figaro and Le Monde. He attended many conferences in France and abroad, mainly in Italy, where the city of Ravenna elected him an honorary citizen in 1986. Frossard presented televisions shows like Voyage sans passeport.

Frossard was elected to the Académie française  Seat 2 to the chair of the René de La Croix de Castries on 18 June 1987, and was received into the institution on 10 March 1988 by Catholic Father Ambroise-Marie Carré.

By 1990, Frossard had written about 15,000 newspaper articles and several books, mostly regarding religion. In 1990, Pope John Paul II awarded him the Grand Cross of the Equestrian Order of the Holy Sepulchre.

Death

Frossard died in Versailles on 2 February 1995 and is buried in the cemetery of Caluire-et-Cuire.

Bibliography

Honours and awards
Officier de la Légion d'honneur
Croix de guerre 1939-1945
Médaille de la Résistance

References

External links
 French biographical notice
Почему я стал католиком
"Dios existe yo me lo encontré": André Frossard
André Frossard 
Frossard, André (1915-1995)
WorldCat

1915 births
1995 deaths
People from Doubs
20th-century French non-fiction writers
Members of the Académie Française
Converts to Roman Catholicism from atheism or agnosticism
French Roman Catholics
Officiers of the Légion d'honneur
Recipients of the Resistance Medal
French Navy personnel of World War II
20th-century French male writers
French Resistance members
Le Figaro people